Nosferatu steindachneri, Steindachner's cichlid, is a species of cichlid endemic to Mexico where it is found in the Tamasopo, Gallinas and Ojo Frio Rivers of the Panuco River basin. It reaches a maximum size of  SL.  This species can also be found in the aquarium trade. The specific name honours the Austrian ichthyologist Franz Steindachner (1834-1919).

References

steindachneri
Freshwater fish of Mexico
Endemic fish of Mexico
Pánuco River
Natural history of San Luis Potosí
Natural history of Tamaulipas
Natural history of Veracruz
Endangered fish
Cichlid fish of Central America
Fish described in 1899
Taxa named by David Starr Jordan
Taxa named by John Otterbein Snyder